Farrokhlagha Houshmand (1929 – 2009) (née Farrokh Lagha Poursol) was an Iranian actress in film, television, and theater. She appeared in more than 70 movies.

Biography 
Farrokh Lagha Poursol was born in 1929 in Rasht, Pahlavi Iran. Her father was one of the founders of the Rasht Theater, and she had initially studied acting as a child in Rasht. 

In 1957, she starred in her first film , a film about a taxi driver that is climbs social status "ladders" when he is mistaken for being a wealthy accountant. In 1966, she started acting in television, starring in a National Iranian Television (NITV) live program with Iraj Nazerian, Ezatullah Moqbeli, and Roghaye Chehreh Azad. She became famous for playing the character "Nene Agha", the mother of the popular television and film fictional character Samad.

Filmography

Film 

 1957 – 
 1958 – 
 1963 – 
 1963 – 
 1965 – 
 1965 – Night of the Hunchback, adapted from a story in 1001 Nights.
 1971 – 
 1972 – 
 1972 – 
 1972 – Mehdi in Black and Hot Mini Pants
 1973 – 
 1974 – 
 1975 – 
 1977 – 
 1978 – 
 1979 – 
 1989 – Bashu, the Little Stranger, as sister-in-law
 1995 – The Journey, as character Bibi

Television 

 1967 to 1970 – , this was the precursor to the show Samad, she was character "Nene Agha"
 1974 – , character "Nene Agha"
 1975 – , character "Nene Agha"
 1975 – 

References

External links 
 

1929 births
2009 deaths
People from Rasht
Iranian comedians
Iranian film actresses
Iranian stage actresses
Iranian television actresses
20th-century Iranian actresses
21st-century Iranian actresses